Panagiotis "Joti" Polizoakis (born 9 June 1995) is a German ice dancer and choreographer. He is a three-time German national champion (2016–2018) and has finished 16th at the 2018 Olympic Winter Games.

Personal life 
Joti Polizoakis was born on 9 June 1995 in Bietigheim-Bissingen. He is the oldest child of a Czech woman and a Greek who was born in Germany. He is fluent in German, Czech, and Greek, as well as English and French. He has two younger siblings. Polizoakis served as a sports soldier in the German military from 2017 - 2019. 

Joti Polizoakis resides and lives in Berlin, Germany.

Career 
Joti Polizoakis belongs, up to this day, to one of the greatest talents in German Figure Skating. His strengths include his very own unique skating style with very good skating skills technique. He is known for his good sense of musicality, which he underlines with charisma, strong interpretation, and his ability to dance on the ice. 

Polizoakis began learning to skate in 2000. He competed at ISU Junior Grand Prix events and won the German junior national title. He was the German Junior National Champion in 2013 and 2014. 

He was coached by Michael Huth.

In 2014–15, he moved up to the senior level but struggled with many injuries and health problems. He competed at two ISU Challenger Series events and placed 6th at the 2015 German Championships.

Partnership with Lorenz 
In the spring of 2015, Polizoakis teamed up with Kavita Lorenz to compete in ice dancing. The two had known each other for many years. They were coached by Igor Shpilband and Martin Skotnický in Novi, Michigan.

Making their international debut, Lorenz/Polizoakis finished fourth at the 2015 Nebelhorn Trophy, a Challenger Series (CS) event. They placed fifth at the 2015 Ondrej Nepela Trophy (CS), first at the 2015 Open d'Andorra, and fifth at the 2015 Warsaw Cup (CS). In December, they won the German national title ahead of Katharina Müller / Tim Dieck and were selected to represent Germany at the 2016 European Championships in Bratislava, Slovakia. At Europeans in January, Lorenz/Polizoakis placed 13th in the short dance to qualify for the free, where they ranked 15th, resulting in a final placement of 14th at their first ISU Championship. In March, they qualified for the final segment at the 2016 World Championships in Boston by placing 18th in the short dance and went on to finish 17th overall. They ended their partnership in April 2016, but announced in June that they would continue skating together.

Polizoakis and Lorenz defended their national title in 2017 and 2018 for three consecutive times and managed to secure a spot for the 2018 Winter Olympics. This should be, so far, the biggest achievement of his career. They switched coaches in the Olympic season to be trained by Marina Zoueva and Massimo Scali in Canton, Michigan. 

After the World Championships in 2018, Lorenz ended her career, and Polizoakis has been looking for a partner ever since.

Olympic Winter Games 
Polizoakis and his partner qualified for the Winter Olympic Games 2018 in PyeongChang, South Korea, by winning the German National Championships in 2018. At the Olympic Games, they placed 7th in the figure skating team event. In the individual event, Polizoakis qualified for the final and ended up in 16th place in the ice dance event.

Holiday On Ice 
Polizoakis toured Germany and Austria as a star guest in the 2019/2020 season with Holiday On Ice. 

In total, he performed in 11 different cities.

Programs

With Lorenz

Single skating

Competitive highlights 
GP: Grand Prix; CS: Challenger Series; JGP: Junior Grand Prix

With Cimlová for Czech Republic

With Lorenz for Germany

Single skating for Germany

TV

Dancing On Ice 
Joti Polizoakis became known nationwide while appearing as a professional Dancer in the first season of Dancing On Ice in 2019. Sarah Lombardi was his partner in the first season, and together they won the first season. 

One year later, he was partnered with Lina Larissa Strahl for the second season of Dancing On Ice. Once again, Polizoakis made it to the final as a pro and finished in third place with Lina Larissa Strahl.

Other projects 
On May 16th, 2020, Polizoakis performed as a dancer at the Free European Song Contest. Since then, he has appeared as a dancer in many music videos.

In the fall of 2020, Polizoakis shot his first short movie as an actor.

References

External links 

 

1995 births
German male ice dancers
German male single skaters
German people of Greek descent
German people of Czech descent
Living people
People from Bietigheim-Bissingen
Sportspeople from Stuttgart (region)
Figure skaters at the 2018 Winter Olympics
Olympic figure skaters of Germany